Sarab-e Saqqa (also Romanized as Sarāb-e Saqqā) is a village in Honam Rural District, in the Central District of Selseleh County, Lorestan Province, Iran. At the 2006 census, its population was 456, in 107 families.

References 

Towns and villages in Selseleh County